is a dam in Takaoka, Kōchi Prefecture, Japan, completed in 1958.

References 

Dams in Kōchi Prefecture
Dams completed in 1958